This is a list of the Hawker Hurricane operators.

Operators

Argentina
Argentine Air Force
Only one example of Hurricane Mk.IV, serial KW908, arrived in 1947 as a present from the British Government to the Argentines.
The aeroplane was packed in 27 boxes and arrived to Buenos Aires on August '47 aboard the ship SS Durango. On 7 July of that year the aircraft was on public display in an exhibition mounted in one of the main squares of Buenos Aires, with other airplanes like a Lancaster and Fiat G55.
In autumn of that year was sent to a flight school of the Argentinian Air Force located in Córdoba, where was painted the national insignia and repainted their camouflage colours; it is known that remained there until the early '60s.

Australia
Royal Australian Air Force
The following units served with the Desert Air Force in the Mediterranean Theatre:

No. 3 Squadron RAAF
No. 450 Squadron RAAF (combined operations with No. 260 Squadron RAF)
No. 451 Squadron RAAF

Only one Hurricane (V7476) saw service in Australia. It had been shipped, unassembled to No. 226 Group RAF in the Dutch East Indies during early 1942. It was among elements of 226 Grp evacuated to Australia before the Allied defeat in Java. After assembly by RAAF ground staff, this Hurricane served with the following units:

No. 1 Communications Flight RAAF
No. 2 Communications Flight RAAF
No. 2 Operational Training Unit RAAF
Central Flying School RAAF

The Hurricane was retired in 1946 and is believed to have been scrapped.

Belgium
Belgian Air Force
Belgium bought 20 Hurricane Mk.Is (early models with fabric covered wings and fixed two-blade propeller) in 1939 and a licence to build 80 more, of which only two were completed, with most of the aircraft being lost during the German invasion when they were bombed at the military airfield at Schaffen near Diest on 10 May 1940. After the war, six ex-RAF Hurricane Mk.IIs (a mix of Mk.IIB and C) were transferred to the Belgians in 1946, these were used as fast communications aircraft up to 1948.

Canada
Several Royal Canadian Air Force squadrons were equipped with Hurricanes, including 1 Squadron RCAF, which flew in the Battle of Britain.

Royal Canadian Air Force
Article XV squadrons serving under direct command and control of the RAF.
 No. 1 Squadron RCAF re-numbered to No. 401 Squadron RCAF
 No. 2 Squadron RCAF re-numbered to No. 402 Squadron RCAF
 No. 417 Squadron RCAF
 No. 421 Squadron RCAF
 No. 438 Squadron RCAF
 No. 439 Squadron RCAF
 No. 440 Squadron RCAF
 Operational Squadrons of the Home War Establishment (HWE) (Based in Canada)
Eastern Air Command
 No. 1 Squadron RCAF
 No. 125 Squadron RCAF
 No. 126 Squadron RCAF
 No. 127 Squadron RCAF
 No. 128 Squadron RCAF
 No. 129 Squadron RCAF
 No. 130 Squadron RCAF
Western Air Command
 No. 133 Squadron RCAF
 No. 135 Squadron RCAF

Czechoslovakia
Czechoslovak Air Force in exile in Great Britain
No. 310 Czech Fighter Squadron
No. 312 Czech Fighter Squadron

Egypt
Royal Egyptian Air Force

Finland

Finland bought 12 Mk.I Hurricanes at the end of the Winter War, but lost two during the transit flight. The aircraft did not have much success (only 5½ kills). When hostilities began again on 25 June 1941, their use was quite limited, partially because they were worn out due to the scarcity of replacement parts available during the Interim Peace (13 March 1940 – 25 June 1941) and subsequent combat flying. One Hurricane Mk.IIB was captured from the Soviets during the war and flown by the Finnish Air Force.

Finnish Air Force
No. 10 Squadron, Finnish Air Force
No. 22 Squadron, Finnish Air Force
No. 26 Squadron, Finnish Air Force
No. 28 Squadron, Finnish Air Force
No. 30 Squadron, Finnish Air Force
No. 32 Squadron, Finnish Air Force
No. 34 Squadron, Finnish Air Force

Free France
Hurricanes also joined the ranks of the Forces Aériennes Françaises Libres (FAFL), the Free French Air Force, fighting in North Africa between June 1940 and May 1943. The Hurricanes, like all FAFL aircraft, sported the Cross of Lorraine on the fuselage, instead of the roundel in order to distinguish them from those aircraft flying for the Vichy French air force. These squadrons were generally formed within the RAF, so that Groupe de Chasse Alsace was known in British circles as No. 341 Squadron RAF

Free French Air Force
Escadrille de Chasse No. 1
Escadrille de Chasse No. 2
Groupe de Chasse II/3 'Alsace'
French Aviation School, Meknes, Morocco

Free French Naval Air Service

Nazi Germany

The Luftwaffe operated some captured Hurricanes for training and education purposes.
Luftwaffe

Kingdom of Greece
Royal Hellenic Air Force
335th Fighter Squadron (No. 335 Squadron RAF)
336th Fighter Squadron (No. 336 Squadron RAF)

British India

Royal Indian Air Force
No.1 Squadron, IAF
No.2 Squadron, IAF
No.3 Squadron, IAF
No.4 Squadron, IAF
No.6 Squadron, IAF
No.7 Squadron, IAF
No.9 Squadron, PAF
No.10 Squadron, IAF
No.1 Service Flying and Training School, Ambala

Iran

First Hurricane (P3270) was delivered from RAF unit. Next 10 aircraft were left by No. 74 Squadron RAF in May 1943 when unit was sent to Egypt. Last 18 Hurricane IIC were delivered in 1946, two of them were rebuilt as two-seat trainers.
Imperial Iranian Air Force
Advanced Fighter Training Group, DoshanTeppeh

Ireland
The Irish Air Corps replaced its Gloster Gladiators with Hawker Hurricanes. During World War II, some Hurricanes which either landed accidentally or force-landed in neutral Ireland were immediately impounded and/or repaired by the authorities, while others were purchased direct from Britain. By the end of the war there were a total of 18 Hurricanes in service, which were gradually withdrawn after the Air Corps received a squadron's worth of Supermarine Seafires in 1947.
Irish Air Corps

Kingdom of Italy
Regia Aeronautica
Two Hurricanes Mk.I, built by Zmaj Aircraft under license, were captured by the Italians when they took over Zemun airfield near Belgrade. Both were later test-flown at the Guidonia facility where more captured aircraft were hoarded. One of them was prominently featured in Roberto Rossellini's period film Un Pilota Ritorna alongside a Bristol Blenheim Mk.IV. Two more fell into Italian hands during the war - one in North Africa and one that touched down intact at Comiso airfield. Their serial numbers are not known.

Empire of Japan
Japanese soldiers captured at least two Hurricanes in Singapore.
Imperial Japanese Army Air Force
Tachikawa GiKen tested Hurricane Mk.IIB Trop (BE208).
1 Chutai of the 64 Sentai tested Hurricane Mk.IIB Trop (BM900).

Netherlands
Royal Netherlands East Indies Army Air Force

New Zealand
New Zealand operated Hurricanes in 486 and 488 Squadrons. Following the fall of Singapore, 488 Squadron's Hurricanes were transferred to New Zealand home service, where some ended their days as airfield decoys.
486 Squadron was formed and operated as a nightfighter unit, operating in conjunction with a Turbinlite Flight, before re-equipping with the Typhoon and becoming a day fighter unit in September 1942.

Royal New Zealand Air Force
No. 486 Squadron RNZAF
No. 488 Squadron RNZAF

Norway
Royal Norwegian Air Force
Two squadrons of Norwegian pilots in the RAF used Hurricane Mk.I and Mk.IIb defending the Scapa Flow naval base on the Orkneys in 1941. In summer 1942, both were transferred South to 11 group, trading in their Hurricanes for Spitfires. A single Hurricane flew in Norway after the war, used for evaluation only.
No. 331 Squadron Royal Norwegian Air Force
No. 332 Squadron RAF

Poland
First Hurricanes were bought by Poland in 1939 but were not delivered before 1 September 1939 and were sent to Turkey instead. Polish pilots could fly Hurricanes in Polish squadrons formed in Great Britain in 1940 and No. 302 and No. 303 Polish Fighter Squadrons took part during Battle of Britain.

Polish Air Forces in exile in Great Britain
No. 302 Polish Fighter Squadron "Poznański"
No. 303 Polish Fighter Squadron "Warszawski Dywizjon im. Tadeusza Kościuszki"
No. 306 Polish Fighter Squadron "Toruński"
No. 308 Polish Fighter Squadron "Krakowski"
No. 309 Polish Army-Cooperation Squadron "Ziemi Czerwieńskiej"
No. 315 Polish Fighter Squadron "Dębliński"
No. 316 Polish Fighter Squadron "Warszawski"
No. 317 Polish Fighter Squadron "Wileński"
No. 318 Polish Fighter-Reconnaissance Squadron "Gdański"

Portugal
Arma de Aeronautica
Esquadrilhas BA 2 (Ota)
Esquadrilhas BA 3 (Tancos)
Lisbon Defense Squadron (Lisboa)

Kingdom of Romania
In 1939 a Romanian military delegation went to United Kingdom to order 50 Hurricane Mk.Is, with 12 for urgent delivery Only 12 were delivered before Romania sided with the Axis. The planes were assigned to the Escadrila 53 Vânătoare/ Fighter Squadron No 53 (transferred to the Air Dobrogea Command from 7th Fighter Group) and were used during the Operation Barbarossa to protect the Black Sea coast, including the vital Constanța harbour and the strategic Cernavodă railway bridge across the Danube.

Some of the first Romanian aerial victories of the war (23 June 1941) were achieved by Lt Horia Agarici of Escadrila 53, who was flying a damaged Hawker Hurricane Mk.I. 
At 12 o'clock at the Mamaia airfield, the alarm was raised. Soviet bombers have been reported, which, apparently were heading for Constanța, to attack the harbour. Despite regulations, Horia Agarici took off without orders, without a wingman and with a single full tank of fuel, starting "the hunting". Good luck and his sense of guidance helped him. Soon a group of five Ilyushin DB-3 bombers appeared in front of his plane, flying at 600 meters altitude, with no fighter escort, attempting to bomb the Romanian fleet.
Taking advantage of a favorable position, Agarici attacked. First shooting the bomber head of the formation, the Soviet aircraft fell into the sea and exploded. After a diving turn and half a barrel roll, Agarici returned to attack, shooting the second plane from its right side. Then he attacked the third bomber, who is heading towards the ground, although he does not have a fire on board. Perhaps the crew chose imprisonment.
The other two Soviet bombers disappeared during this time, abandoning the mission, and Horia Agarici returned to Mamaia airfield, at fuel limit.

In the early days of the war, the Romanian Hurricane pilots shot down eight aircraft without any losses.
On 30 June, Esc. 53 Vân had a particularly successful day. During three air combats, Hurricane pilots claimed 10 Soviet "Grumman" fighters (most probably Polikarpov I-153s) over Ismail-Tulcea, near Danube, for no losses.

Two Hurricane planes were lost by the end of 1941. Warrant officer Andrei Rădulescu managed to be the second ace in the entire campaign, having seven confirmed victories and four unconfirmed with his Hurricane. Other Hurricanes, belonging to the Royal Air Force of Yugoslavia were bought from Germany in 1941.  Escadrila 53 Vânătoare gradually replaced Hurricanes with the Romanian IAR 80 model.

South Africa
South African Air Force operated several squadrons of Hurricanes as part of the Desert Air Force, including 40 Squadron.

South African Air Force
1 Squadron SAAF
2 Squadron SAAF
3 Squadron SAAF
7 Squadron SAAF
40 Squadron SAAF
41 Squadron SAAF
43 Squadron SAAF
11 OTU SAAF
SAAF Central Flying School, Norton, South Rhodesia

Soviet Union

The Soviet Union received 2,952 aircraft of several variants under Lend-Lease Act agreements. These aircraft served on all fronts. One Hurricane Mk.IIB was captured from the Soviets during the war and flown by the Finnish Air Force.

Russian Wikipedia writes that the 894th Fighter Aviation Regiment was equipped with the Hawker Hurricane.

Soviet Air Forces
1 GvIAP
20 GvIAP
9 IAP
27 IAP
46 IAP
145 IAP
157 IAP
180 IAP
191 IAP
197 IAP
246 IAP
287 IAP
436 IAP
438 IAP
485 IAP
609 IAP
743 IAP
814 IAP
831 IAP
832 IAP
858 IAP
760 SAP
22 ZAP
25 ZIAP
27 ZIAP
Soviet Air Defence Forces
26 GvIAP PVO
83 GvIAP PVO
67 IAP PVO
429 IAP PVO
439 IAP PVO
441 IAP PVO
488 IAP PVO
730 IAP PVO
736 IAP PVO
767 IAP PVO
768 IAP PVO
769 IAP PVO
833 IAP PVO
926 IAP PVO
933 IAP PVO
934 IAP PVO
964 IAP PVO
Soviet Naval Aviation
2 GvIAP VVS VMF
3 GvIAP VVS VMF
27 IAP VVS VMF
78 IAP VVS VMF

Turkey
Turkey bought Hurricanes in 1939.

Turkish Air Force

United Kingdom
The last Hurricanes were withdrawn from RAF first-line service in February 1947, although two remain in service with the RAF's Battle of Britain Memorial Flight.

Royal Air Force
No. 1 Squadron RAF
No. 3 Squadron RAF
No. 5 Squadron RAF
No. 6 Squadron RAF
No. 11 Squadron RAF (SEAC)
No. 17 Squadron RAF
No. 20 Squadron RAF (SEAC)
No. 27 Squadron RAF
No. 28 Squadron RAF
No. 29 Squadron RAF
No. 30 Squadron RAF
No. 32 Squadron RAF
No. 33 Squadron RAF
No. 34 Squadron RAF (SEAC)
No. 42 Squadron RAF
No. 43 Squadron RAF
No. 46 Squadron RAF
No. 56 Squadron RAF
No. 60 Squadron RAF
No. 63 Squadron RAF - (Bombardment spotting)
No. 67 Squadron RAF
No. 69 Squadron RAF
No. 71 Squadron RAF
No. 73 Squadron RAF
No. 74 Squadron RAF
No. 79 Squadron RAF
No. 80 Squadron RAF
No. 81 Squadron RAF
No. 85 Squadron RAF
No. 87 Squadron RAF
No. 91 Squadron RAF
No. 92 Squadron RAF
No. 94 Squadron RAF
No. 95 Squadron RAF
No. 96 Squadron RAF
No. 98 Squadron RAF - (Coastal patrol)
No. 111 Squadron RAF
No. 113 Squadron RAF
No. 116 Squadron RAF
No. 121 Squadron RAF
No. 123 Squadron RAF
No. 126 Squadron RAF
No. 127 Squadron RAF
No. 128 Squadron RAF
No. 131 Squadron RAF
No. 133 Squadron RAF
No. 134 Squadron RAF
No. 135 Squadron RAF
No. 136 Squadron RAF
No. 137 Squadron RAF
No. 145 Squadron RAF
No. 146 Squadron RAF
No. 151 Squadron RAF
No. 164 Squadron RAF
No. 173 Squadron RAF - (Communications)
No. 174 Squadron RAF
No. 175 Squadron RAF
No. 176 Squadron RAF
No. 181 Squadron RAF
No. 182 Squadron RAF
No. 183 Squadron RAF
No. 184 Squadron RAF
No. 185 Squadron RAF
No. 186 Squadron RAF
No. 193 Squadron RAF
No. 195 Squadron RAF
No. 198 Squadron RAF
No. 208 Squadron RAF
No. 213 Squadron RAF
No. 225 Squadron RAF
No. 229 Squadron RAF
No. 232 Squadron RAF
No. 237 Squadron RAF
No. 238 Squadron RAF
No. 239 Squadron RAF
No. 241 Squadron RAF
No. 242 Squadron RAF
No. 245 Squadron RAF
No. 247 Squadron RAF
No. 249 Squadron RAF
No. 250 Squadron RAF
No. 253 Squadron RAF
No. 255 Squadron RAF
No. 256 Squadron RAF
No. 257 Squadron RAF
No. 258 Squadron RAF
No. 260 Squadron RAF - (Combined operations with No. 450 Squadron RAAF)
No. 261 Squadron RAF
No. 263 Squadron RAF
No. 273 Squadron RAF
No. 274 Squadron RAF
No. 276 Squadron RAF
No. 279 Squadron RAF
No. 283 Squadron RAF
No. 284 Squadron RAF - (Air-Sea Rescue)
No. 285 Squadron RAF
No. 286 Squadron RAF
No. 287 Squadron RAF
No. 288 Squadron RAF
No. 289 Squadron RAF
No. 290 Squadron RAF
No. 291 Squadron RAF
No. 501 Squadron RAF
No. 504 Squadron RAF
No. 516 Squadron RAF
No. 518 Squadron RAF
No. 520 Squadron RAF
No. 521 Squadron RAF - (Meteorological)
No. 527 Squadron RAF - (Calibration)
No. 530 Squadron RAF
No. 531 Squadron RAF
No. 532 Squadron RAF
No. 533 Squadron RAF
No. 534 Squadron RAF
No. 535 Squadron RAF
No. 536 Squadron RAF
No. 537 Squadron RAF
No. 538 Squadron RAF
No. 539 Squadron RAF
No. 567 Squadron RAF
No. 577 Squadron RAF
No. 587 Squadron RAF
No. 595 Squadron RAF
No. 598 Squadron RAF
No. 601 Squadron RAF
No. 605 Squadron RAF
No. 607 Squadron RAF
No. 610 Squadron RAF
No. 615 Squadron RAF
No. 624 Squadron RAF
No. 631 Squadron RAF
No. 639 Squadron RAF
No. 650 Squadron RAF
No. 667 Squadron RAF
No. 679 Squadron RAF
No. 691 Squadron RAF
No. 695 Squadron RAF
No. 680 Squadron RAF
No. 681 Squadron RAF
No. 1432 Flight RAF
Night Fighter Unit

Fleet Air Arm
702 Naval Air Squadron
731 Naval Air Squadron
748 Naval Air Squadron
759 Naval Air Squadron
760 Naval Air Squadron
761 Naval Air Squadron
762 Naval Air Squadron
766 Naval Air Squadron
768 Naval Air Squadron
769 Naval Air Squadron
771 Naval Air Squadron
774 Naval Air Squadron
778 Naval Air Squadron
779 Naval Air Squadron
781 Naval Air Squadron
787 Naval Air Squadron
788 Naval Air Squadron
789 Naval Air Squadron
791 Naval Air Squadron
792 Naval Air Squadron
794 Naval Air Squadron
795 Naval Air Squadron
800 Naval Air Squadron
801 Naval Air Squadron
802 Naval Air Squadron
804 Naval Air Squadron
806 Naval Air Squadron
813 Naval Air Squadron
824 Naval Air Squadron
825 Naval Air Squadron
835 Naval Air Squadron
877 Naval Air Squadron
880 Naval Air Squadron
882 Naval Air Squadron
883 Naval Air Squadron
885 Naval Air Squadron
891 Naval Air Squadron
895 Naval Air Squadron
897 Naval Air Squadron

Yugoslavia

Zmaj factory built 20 Hurricanes under licence along with 24 examples delivered from Britain. After the war 16 aircraft were used by the SFR Yugoslav Air Force.
Yugoslav Royal Air Force
No. 51 Squadron, 2 Lovacki Puk VVKJ
No. 33 Squadron, 4 Lovacki Puk VVKJ
No. 34 Squadron, 4 Lovacki Puk VVKJ
Yugoslav Squadrons in the RAF
No. 351 Squadron RAF
No. 352 Squadron RAF
SFR Yugoslav Air Force
1st Fighter Regiment (1945)
Reconnaissance Aviation Regiment (1947–1948)
103rd Reconnaissance Aviation Regiment (1948–1951)

Other users

Latvia 
Latvian Aviation Regiment (Latvian Air Force)

In 1939, Latvia ordered and paid for 30 British Hawker Hurricane fighters, but due to the start of World War II later that year, they were never delivered.

See also
Hawker Hurricane
Hawker Hurricane variants

References

Notes

Bibliography

 Bernád, Dénes. Rumanian Aces of World War 2 (Aircraft of the Aces 54). Botley, Oxford, UK: Osprey Publishing, 2003. .
 Bernád, Dénes. Dmitry Karlenko and Jean-Louis Roba, From Barbarossa to Odessa- The Luftwaffe and Axis Allies strike South-East: June–October 1941. Hinckley, LE, UK:  Ian Allan Publishing, 2007. 
 Birtles, Philip. Hurricane Squadrons in Focus. Walton on Thames, Surrey, UK: Red Kite, 2003. .
 Bridgwater, H.C. and Scott, Peter. Combat Colours Number 4; Pearl Harbor and Beyond, December 1941 to May 1942. Luton, Bedfordshire, UK: Guideline Publications, 2001. .
 Franks, Richard A. The Hawker Hurricane, a Comprehensive Guide for the Modeller (Modellers Datafile 2). Bedford, UK: SAM Publications, 1999. .
 Lopes, Mário Canongia. Spitfires e Hurricanes em Portugal (Bilingual Portuguese/English). Lisboa, Portugal: Dinalivro, 1993. .
 Ryś, Marek. Hawker Hurricane. Sandomierz, Poland/Redbourn, Herts, UK: Mushroom Model Publications, 2006. .
 Gretzyngier, Robert. Polskie Skrzydła 4 - Hawker Hurricane, część 1. Sandomierz, Poland: Stratus 2005. . (Polish)
 Wawrzyński, Mirosław. Hurricane w obcej służbie - Hurricane in Foreign Service. Warsaw, Poland: AJaKS-Książki Militarne, 2001. . (Polish with English summary)

Lists of military units and formations of World War II
Operators
Hurricane